Bebington is a town and unparished area within the Metropolitan Borough of Wirral, in Merseyside, England. Nearby towns include Birkenhead and Wallasey to the north-northwest, and Heswall to the west-southwest. Bebington railway station opened in 1838 and is situated on the Wirral line of the Merseyrail network.

The electoral ward, which includes the original village centres of Higher Bebington and Lower Bebington, had a total resident population of 13,720 at the 2001 census. which increased to 15,768 at the 2011 census. Some definitions of Bebington include adjoining areas such as Port Sunlight (an early planned factory town), New Ferry, Spital and Storeton. The former Municipal Borough of Bebington, a local authority between 1937 and 1974, also included within its boundaries Bromborough, Eastham, Raby, Thornton Hough and Brimstage, which now fall within the electoral wards of Bromborough, Eastham and Clatterbridge.  Bebington forms part of the wider Birkenhead urban area, which had a population of 325,264 in 2011.

According to a 2015 study commissioned by Royal Mail from the Centre for Economic and Business Research, Bebington's postcode area, CH63, is the most desirable in England in which to live and work. The study found that the area had "the ideal balance" of housing close to places of work, good schools and high employment.

History
The name Bebington is derived from the Anglo-Saxon meaning the "Village of Bebba", probably a Saxon chief or landowner.

The area is thought to be the site of the "Birth of England" at the Battle of Brunanburh in 937,
an English victory by the army of Æthelstan, King of England, and his brother Edmund over the combined armies of Olaf Guthfrithson, King of Dublin, Constantine II, King of Alba, and Owain ap Dyfnwal, King of the Cumbrians. Though relatively little known today, it was called "the greatest single battle in Anglo-Saxon history before Hastings." Michael Livingston claimed that Brunanburh marks "the moment when Englishness came of age." The Brackenwood golf course was cited in 2004 as the most likely site for the Battle of Brunanburh.
Mention of the battle is made in dozens of sources, in Old English, Latin, Irish, Welsh, Anglo-Norman and Middle English, and there are many later accounts or responses to the battle. A contemporary record of the battle is found in the Old English poem Battle of Brunanburh, preserved in the Anglo-Saxon Chronicle.

The Church of St. Andrew, on a site occupied since Saxon times, dates from the 14th and 16th centuries.

In 1801, Bebington was a small country hamlet with a population of only 273, situated on the main road connecting Chester and Birkenhead, and then via ferry to Liverpool. Up to 30 horse-drawn coaches would pass by each day. By 1840, the Birkenhead to Chester railway was running and in 1844 the New Chester Road opened and Bebington lost its coaching traffic.

In 1838, the footprints of an archosaur later called the Chirotherium storetonese were found in a sandstone bed at Storeton Quarry. Examples can be seen at the Liverpool Museum and at Christ Church within the parish of Higher Bebington. Also a small example can be seen at Higher Bebington Junior School, in their reception area.

Stone quarried at Bebington was used for the construction of Birkenhead Town Hall, some of the villas around Birkenhead and Rock Parks and most famously of all the Empire State Building in New York City. The stone is considered to be a high quality sandstone which is creamy in appearance. The quarries were eventually filled in with debris removed during the construction of the two Mersey Tunnels.

Mayer Hall, in Lower Bebington village, was formerly an art gallery built by Bebington philanthropist Joseph Mayer, a noted antiquarian, whose collection of Anglo-Saxon antiquaries helped in the development of British archaeology. He made Pennant House his home. It is still a community resource and boasts many of its original features.

Geography

Education
Bebington contains ten main schools; Wirral Grammar School for Boys, Wirral Grammar School for Girls, St John Plessington Catholic College, St John's Junior and Infant Schools, Higher Bebington Junior School, Co-op Academy Bebington, Brackenwood Junior School, Stanton Road Primary School, St Andrew's Primary School, Town Lane Infants School, Church Drive Primary School.

Cultural references
The Oval Sports Centre was used in the film, Chariots of Fire, to portray the 1924 Colombes Olympic Stadium in Paris.

Warship Week WW2
In March 1942 after a successful ‘Warship Week’ National Savings campaign HMS Sabre (H18) was adopted by the civil community of Bebington, Cheshire, the same month she was detached for escort of the Russian Convoy PQ 13 during its initial stage of passage to Iceland in the Northwest Approaches.

Notable people
Liz Carr, actress and disability rights activist was born (in 1972) in Port Sunlight, Bebington
Frances Jacson, novelist (1754–1842), was born in Bebington.
Lottie Dod (1871–1960), "the most versatile female athlete of all time" and five times Wimbledon tennis champion, was born in Bebington.
Professional footballer Dixie Dean (1907–1980), lived in Higher Bebington.
Michael Goodliffe (1914–1976), film and television actor was born in Bebington.
The historian and antiquarian Hilda R. Ellis Davidson (1914–2006) was born in Bebington.
Harold Wilson (1916–1995), British Prime Minister, lived in the area from the age of 16 and was head boy at Wirral Grammar School.
The authors Roger Lancelyn Green (1918–1987) and Richard Lancelyn Green (1953–2004) lived in Poulton Lancelyn, Bebington.
Kenneth Halliwell (1926–1967), partner and murderer of playwright Joe Orton, was born in Heath Road and attended Wirral Grammar School.
Professional footballer Brian Harris (1935–2008), was born in Bebington.
Phil Liggett, cycling commentator, was born in Bebington in 1943.
David Mather (born 1975), cricketer
Carl Rees (born 1943), head coach of American Fairfield Stags men's soccer team
Film director Alex Cox was born in Bebington in 1954.
Ted Robbins (born 1955), entertainer and actor, was a resident of the town.
Jan Ravens, impressionist and actress, born in Bebington in 1958.
Singer Pete Burns, (1959–2016) was born in Port Sunlight, Bebington and attended Co-op Academy bebington.
Chris Sharrock, ex Icicle Works, Oasis and current Beady Eye drummer, born in Bebington in 1964.
Chris Malkin, former professional footballer, was born in Bebington in 1967.
Paul Nowak, trade unionist, born in Bebington in 1972
Professional rugby player Matt Cairns (born 1979) was brought up in Spital and went to Wirral Grammar School for Boys.
Dom Phillips, journalist killed in Brazil in 2022

See also
Listed buildings in Bebington
Bebington parliamentary constituency (1950 – Feb 1974)
Bebington and Ellesmere Port parliamentary constituency (Feb 1974 – 1983)
:Category:People from Bebington

References

Bibliography

External links

Towns in Merseyside
Towns and villages in the Metropolitan Borough of Wirral
Unparished areas in Merseyside